Magdalen College of the Liberal Arts (formerly Northeast Catholic College, The College of Saint Mary Magdalen, and simply Magdalen College), is a private Catholic liberal arts college in Warner, New Hampshire. It is recognized as a Catholic college by the Diocese of Manchester and recommended by the Cardinal Newman Society.  Magdalen College offers associate and bachelor's degrees in liberal studies with majors in philosophy, theology, history, and literature as well as a multi-disciplinary major in the great books. Its curriculum is based on the study of the great books throughout its curriculum both in its core and in its majors. Magdalen College possesses degree-granting authority from the State of New Hampshire and is regionally accredited by the New England Association of Schools and Colleges.

Magdalen College was founded by Catholic laymen in 1973. From 1974 to 1991 the college operated at its original campus in Bedford, New Hampshire; in 1991, it moved to its current site in Warner.

History

Magdalen College (1973-2010)
Catholic laymen Francis Boucher, John Meehan and Peter Sampo founded "Magdalen College" in 1973, responding to the Second Vatican Council's call for the education of lay Catholic leaders, and with the encouragement of the Bishop of Manchester, Ernest John Primeau. The college was chartered by the State of New Hampshire August 22, 1973, and enrolled its first students in September 1974. The first class consisted of sixteen students and their first day of classes was Friday, September 6, 1974. The initial staff consisted of two professors, and three assistants teaching Latin, Philosophy, Mathematics, Science, and Music.

From 1974 to 1991, the college operated at its original campus, a former motel building in Bedford, New Hampshire. In 1979, there were 70 students and 20 alumni.

Under the presidency of co-founder John Meehan, the college followed a policy of standing in loco parentis and closely supervised students' dress, manners, and behavior in order to maintain a moral atmosphere.

Move to Warner campus

In 1988, there were 39 students. New Hampshire state education officials questioned the college's financial stability. A benefactor's support enabled the college to continue operation. Within three years, Magdalen College had purchased and developed a new campus property. The college relocated to its current site in Warner, New Hampshire, in 1991.

Outreach and re-founding
From 2007 to 2011, the college owned the Durward's Glen retreat house in Baraboo, Wisconsin, formerly a novitiate for the Order of St. Camillus, and operated it as a site for retreats, religious events, and educational programs.

From 2008 to 2010, Magdalen College discussed a merger or "unification" with Thomas More College of Liberal Arts in Merrimack, New Hampshire. Though the merger was cancelled, both institutions learned from each other and now meet from time to time for intramural sports. During the same period, the college underwent a process of reform to shed its image of severity; the student handbook was revised.

The College of Saint Mary Magdalen (2010-2015)
In October 2010, the college was renamed "The College of Saint Mary Magdalen". It modified its curriculum to include studies of ancient Rome, the Middle Ages, the Renaissance, and post-Modern culture, and a four-year cycle of music and art courses.

In 2011, the students and faculty of the Erasmus Institute of Liberal Arts, founded by Magdalen's first president Peter V. Sampo, joined the college, bringing with them the institute's four-year liberal arts curriculum inspired by educators Donald and Louise Cowan. However, by the end of the first semester of having two programs, the great books and the Cowan, it became clear that the dual program approach "would not work". The Cowan Program faculty and parts of the program itself would be merged with the great books program, and the remaining Cowan students would be grandfathered in and allowed to continue according to the Cowan Program. The curriculum merger lead to the introduction of concentrations and the optional study of Greek into the great books Program.

In light of the changes to the curriculum and student life policies, the president stated that "this is really a new college."

Northeast Catholic College (2015-2019)

In January 2015, to mark the culmination of eight years of change and development, the college adopted the name "Northeast Catholic College". Coincident with the renaming, the college announced five majors—great books, theology, philosophy, literature, and politics—a new "Career Pathways Program", and new co-patronage under Pope John Paul II. As of 2015, enrollment was reported to be 61 students. The religious makeup of the student body was reported to be 95% Catholic. In January 2016, Northeast Catholic College became the first college in the nation to adopt the Classic Learning Test (CLT) as an alternative to the SAT and ACT.

Following the college's hosting of a Napa Institute seminar in New York City in 2014, the college was invited to offer another seminar in July 2015 at the Napa Institute in California. Senior faculty of the college were also invited to lead seminars as part of an "Intellectual Retreat" organized by the journal First Things in New York City. The college continued to lead First Things intellectual retreats in New York in 2016, 2017, 2018, and 2019.

In the fall of 2018, the college added a semester abroad that integrated study in Rome, Krakow, and Norcia as well as a summer program of studies in Oxford. The college also integrated elements from the Cowan curriculum into the program of studies, including a cyclic and team-taught approach to the humanities consisting of 48 credits that united the college in a single program of reading across four years. That year the college also expanded its faculty to include the scholar and translator Anthony Esolen.

Magdalen College of the Liberal Arts (2019-present)
On August 12, 2019, it was announced that, in anticipation of the college's 50th anniversary in 2023, the trustees of the college—including its founding president, Dr. Peter Sampo—had elected to again take up its founding name, "Magdalen College", together with the addendum "of the Liberal Arts".

On June 22, 2020, George Harne announced that he would resign as president of Magdalen College to become the Executive Dean for School of Arts & Sciences at the University of St. Thomas in Houston. Dr. Eric Buck took up the role of interim president for one year as the school searched for a new president. In July 2021, Dr. Ryan Messmore began as President of Magdalen College of the Liberal Arts.

Presidents
 Peter V. Sampo, 1974-1977
 John Meehan, 1977-1998
 Jeffrey Karls, 1998-2011
 George Harne, 2011-2020
Eric Buck, 2020-2021 (interim)
Ryan Messmore, 2021- Present

Catholic identity 

The Cardinal Newman Society has recognized the college for its fidelity and Catholic identity. In 2011 the college was consecrated to the Sacred Heart and in 2014, the president outlined the principles of the college's approach to student life in an essay entitled "Finding God on the Quad: Pope Benedict XVI's Vision for Catholic Higher Education." Students regularly participate in the New Hampshire and National March for Life, have been involved in public support for religious freedom, and participated in "Catholic Day at the State House" in 2015.

On March 13, 2015, the college announced its Dignitas scholarships (inspired by the example of Mother Teresa), a program that integrates pro-life work with service to the poor through international and local service opportunities.

After its students provided music for its first Mass in 2016, the college has maintained a warm relationship with St. Stanislaus Catholic Church in Nashua, New Hampshire, a parish of the Priestly Fraternity of Saint Peter, where the traditional Latin Mass is celebrated exclusively. In January 2018, the college announced a partnership with Father Michael Gaitley, MIC, and his "Marian Missionaries of Divine Mercy".

Each academic year begins with a votive Mass of the Holy Spirit at which the Catholic faculty and staff take the Oath of Fidelity, usually in the presence of the bishop. The faculty members who teach theology also request the mandatum from the bishop in accord with Pope John Paul II's apostolic constitution Ex corde ecclesiae (II.4.3). Recent commencements speakers include Ovide Lamontagne (2012), George Weigel (2013), Dan Burke (2014), and Ralph Martin (2015).

Beginning in 2011, the college began holding a celebration of the Tridentine form of the Roman Rite once a week, and from 2013 also of the Divine Liturgy in the Melkite Rite once per semester. In its celebration of the ordinary form of the Mass, the college's chaplain celebrates ad orientem, and the propers of the Mass are sung in Latin or English.

Academics
The college offers curricula based on studying the "great books" of Western civilization both within the curriculum’s core and in its five majors. In the college's Program of Studies the faculty primarily employ a Socratic pedagogy of questioning and discussion in small seminars. Courses of study are inspired by the classical trivium and quadrivium. Students may also receive a Vatican-established Apostolic Catechetical Diploma. The college offers majors, as of 2015, in Theology, Politics, Philosophy, Literature, and the great books.

In May 2019 the college's Program of Studies was awarded an "A" rating by the American Council of Trustees and Alumni, placing it among only four Catholic institutions with that rating.

Great books core curriculum

With the exception of one major course per semester in the junior and senior years and capstone projects such as the Junior Project and senior thesis or portfolio, all students follow the same great books core curriculum. The course of studies includes a four-year philosophy and humanities sequence of seminars, three years of theology leading to an Apostolic Catechetical Diploma, four years of music and art integrated within the Humanities cycle, two years of Greek or Latin, four semesters of science, and courses in logic, geometry, and writing. Students complete a junior project based in their major and as seniors complete comprehensive exams and have the opportunity to write a senior thesis.

Arts of the Beautiful program
The college offers students the opportunity to learn Gregorian chant and polyphony, and to participate in liturgies inspired by what Pope Benedict XVI called "the reform of the reform". Although chant and other forms of sacred music are employed at each Mass of the academic year, the liturgies for Holy Week and Easter are marked by extensive use of the Church's musical patrimony. The study of sacred music, music appreciation, and the visual arts in the Humanities cycle (as well as guest lectures) supplement these opportunities for liturgical formation and are part of the college's "Arts of the Beautiful" program.

Degrees
Students may obtain an Associate of Liberal Arts and a Bachelor of Liberal Arts.

On October 17, 1983, the Sacred Congregation for the Clergy issued a rescript granting the college authority to award the "Diploma for Religious Instruction". Now called the "Apostolic Catechetical Diploma", this diploma is awarded to Catholic students who complete the eight-semester sequence of theological studies with at least a 2.0 GPA in each course and who pledge to teach Catholic doctrine in communion with the Holy See.

Accreditation
In 2009, the college reported the start of a self-study process for regional accreditation by the New England Association of Schools and Colleges (NEASC). Until 2012, the college was accredited through the American Academy for Liberal Education (AALE). In May 2013, the college officially withdrew from the AALE. The college gained "candidate" status with NEASC in 2013. In 2018, the college obtained NEASC regular regionally accredited status. In 2021, the college was put on probation status due to financial insecurity and an uncertain future.

Student life
The college offers intramural sports in soccer, basketball, volleyball, softball, and hockey. Sporting events take place from time to time between student teams from Magdalen College and the Thomas More College of Liberal Arts in football, soccer and basketball. There are also occasional sporting events between faculty/staff and student teams.

Student organizations
Student Life hosts a "student organization night" in the fall semester. Each organization has a booth to promote its activities. Student organizations include:

Student/President Advisory Council
Student Activities Board
Confraternity of St. Joseph
Sodality of Mary
Knights of Columbus
Spes Vitae pro-life club
St. Genesius Players
Polyphony Choir
Dancing Club
Rowing Club

References

Notes

External links

Official website

 
Liberal arts colleges in New Hampshire
Educational institutions established in 1973
Universities and colleges in Merrimack County, New Hampshire
Catholic universities and colleges in New Hampshire
Warner, New Hampshire